Beciu is a commune in Teleorman County, Muntenia, Romania. It is composed of three villages: Bârseștii de Jos, Beciu and Smârdan. These were part of Plopii-Slăvitești Commune until 2004, when they were split off.

References

Communes in Teleorman County
Localities in Muntenia